Notiophilus rufipes is a genus of ground beetle native to the Palearctic and the Near East.

References

External links
Global Biodiversity Information

Nebriinae
Beetles described in 1829